Johanna Bäcklund (born 9 June 1985) is a Swedish athlete. She competed in the women's marathon event at the 2019 World Athletics Championships.

References

External links

1985 births
Living people
Swedish female long-distance runners
Swedish female marathon runners
Place of birth missing (living people)
World Athletics Championships athletes for Sweden